Alex Battler (born Rafik Shagi-Akzamovich Aliyev on December 10, 1946), known in Russia under the pen name Oleg Alekseyevich Arin, is a Soviet-born Russian-Canadian scholar and political writer. He is a member of the organization «Defend Science» (US).

Life and career
Alex Battler was born in Astrakhan. In 1966 he entered the Faculty of Oriental studies of the A. Zhdanov Leningrad State University. After graduating in 1971, he enrolled in the post-graduate school at the Institute of the Far Eastern Studies in Moscow. In 1975 he was conferred the Degree of Candidate of Science (= PhD), and in 1988 his Doctor of Science dissertation in the specialty "history of foreign policy and international relations".

In 1993 he immigrated to Canada where he acquired Canadian citizenship. In 1997 he returned to Russia and worked at several institutions of higher learning in Moscow. In 2001 he moved to the United Kingdom; later he lived for several years in France. Currently he has permanent residence in New York.

Through the years he held various positions at different research institutions: the Institute of the Far Eastern Studies; the Institute of World Economy and International Relations; the Institute of Social Sciences of the CPSU Central Committee; Moscow State Institute of International Relations of the Russian Federation's Ministry of Foreign Affairs; the Institute of Philosophy. He served as Director of the Institute of Economic and International Studies of the Pacific Region (Vladivostok).

He also taught as a professor of political science, economics, and international relations at several universities and institutes in Russia (Moscow State University; the Institute of Philosophy; the International Independent University of Ecology & Political Science); in Japan (Nagoya University); in Canada (the University of British Columbia).

Work
The result of Battler's scientific work is a number of laws and regularities in the areas of philosophy, sociology and the theory of international relations; he discovered these laws based on re-interpreting key terms and turning into concepts and categories. The single most important among them is the category of force which in the book Dialectics of Force turned into ontóbia (ontological force) – one of the attributes of being, along with the categories of matter, motion, time and space. This attribute status of ontóbia enabled Battler to advance his own version of the Big Bang conception and of the Universe's expansion process. In the organic world ontóbia turns into orgábia (the organic force). From the perspective of Battler's theory, life begins with man. The ontóbia theory also makes its possible to resolve the problems of consciousness and thought, of their qualitative differences and manifestations.

In another book titled Society: Progress and Force (Criteria and First Principles) Battler formulated new definitions of the concept Progress and the forms of social forces' manifestation through the laws of force (principles): The First Principle of social development, or the law of social force; and the Second Principle of social development, or the law of social knowledge. In the book On Love, Family, and the State he presented the laws of love and family, which are tied to the functioning of the law of entropy growth.

Within the framework of the international relations theory Battler formulated (in his monograph The 21st Century: the World without Russia) two laws: the law of geoeconomics (poles) and the law of geostrategy (center of power). He also introduced a new concept: the foreign policy potential of a state – and methods for calculating it, as well as the optimal proportions of expenditures on foreign policy in accordance with the state's foreign policy goals.

Battler also authored the 13 commandments of the roslyane, which he promotes as a replacement for the well-known Biblical commandments. In Battler's theory the roslyane are the people who should emerge in Russia after the current system is replaced.

Publications

A

Academic books (authored)
Battler, Alex. Contemporary International Relations. The Politics of the Great Powers: Theory and Practice. A course of lectures. SCHOLARICA, 2022. – 496 p.
Arin. Russia: March to the Execution (Putin-ism, If-ism, Russo-bluff-ism). SCHOLARICA (in Russian), 2022. –  228 p.
Arin,Oleg. Russia vs the West: Revanche (Lectures, articles, prognoses).  SCHOLARICA, (in Russian), 2022. - 282 p.
Arin. Atheism: Fight against Religion. SCHOLARICA (in Russian), 2022. – 254 p.
Arin. The science of God. Volume VI. Religion: Action and Counteraction. SCHOLARICA (in Russian), 2022. –  390 p
Arin. The science of God. Volume V. Religion: Science and Society. SCHOLARICA (in Russian), 2021. –  524 p
Battler, Alex. On Love, Family, and the State: Philosophical-sociological Essay. /Second edition. SCHOLARICA, 2021. –– 190 p.  Also:  (ISBN 978-1-7355989-5-6)
Arin. The science of God. Volume IV. Christianity and Politics.  SCHOLARICA (in Russian), 2021. –  566 p.
Arin, Oleg. Tsarist Russia: The Collapse of Capitalism (Late 19th - Early 20th Century). SCHOLARICA (In Russian), 2020. –– 354 p.
Arin. The science of God. Volume III. The philosophy of Christianity. M.: Publishing House ITRK, 2019. –  516 p..
Arin. The science of God. Volume II. The ideology of Christianity. M.: Publishing House ITRK, 2019. – 380 p..
Arin. The science of God. Volume I. The phenomenology of the Bible. M.: Publishing House ITRK, 2019. – 468 p..
Battler, Alex. Eurasia: Illusions and Reality. M.: ITRK Publishing House, 2018. – 136 p..
Arin, Oleg. My wife and me – agents of CIA. Moscow: Publishing House ITRK, 2018. – 416 p..
Battler, Alex. Mirology: Progress and Force in the World Relations. Vol. II. Struggle of all against all. (In Russian). Moscow: Izdatelstvo ITRK, 2015. – 672 p. 
Battler, Alex. Mirology: Progress and Force in the World Relations. Vol.I. Introduction to Mirology. (In Russian). Moscow: Izdatelstvo ITRK, 2014 – p. 256.
Battler, Alex. Society: Progress and Force (Criteria and First Principles). A New Edition and Translation, New York, 2013. – p. 375. Book review.
Battler, Alex. Dialectics of Force: Ontobia. A New Edition and Translation, New York, 2013. – p. 322. Book review.
Battler, Alex. Society: Progress and Force (Criteria and First Principles) [Общество: прогресс и сила (критерии и основные начала). – М.: Издательство ЛКИ, 2008. – 328 с.]
Battler, Alex. Society: Progress and Force (Criteria and First Principles)/ translated from the Russian. Moscow: KRASSAND (In English), 2009. – 344 p.
Battler, Alex. On Love, Family, and the State: Philosophical-sociological Essay [О любви, семье и государстве. –  М.: КомКнига, 2006. – 168 с.]
Battler, Alex. On Love, Family, and the State: Philosophical-sociological Essay/ Translated from the Russian. Moscow, KomKniga (In English), 2008. – 168 p.
Battler, Alex. Dialectics of Force: Ontóbia [Диалектика силы: онтόбия. –  М.: Едиториал УРСС, 2005. – 320 с.]
Battler, Alex. Dialectics of Force: Ontóbia/ Translated from the Russian. – Moscow: KomKniga (In English), 2008. – 272 p.
Arin, Oleg. The 21st Century: The World without Russia [Двадцать первый век: мир без России. – Москва: Альянс, 2001. – 352 с.]; Second edition: Арин О.А. Мир без России. – М.: ЭКСМО•Алгоритм, 2002. – 480 с.
Battler, Alex. The 21st Century: The World without Russia. USA: American University   & Colleges Press, 2004. – 388 p.
21 Shiji: meiyou eluosi de shijie (The 21st Century: The World without Russia), Shanghai (In Chinese), 2005. – 438 с.
Arin, Oleg. The Strategic Contours of East Asia in 21st Century. Russia: Not a Step Forward (Moscow: Alyans, 2001) [Стратегические контуры Восточной Азии. Россия: ни шагу вперед. – М.: Альянс, 2001. – 192 с.]
Arin, Oleg. Japan: View on the World, Asia and Russia [Япония: взгляд на мир, на Азию и Россию. –  М.: МГИМО, 2001. – 92 с.]
Arin, Oleg. The Strategic Perspectives of Russia in Eastern Asia. Moscow: MGIMO, 1999 [Стратегические перспективы России в Восточной Азии. – М.: МГИМО, 1999. – 112 с.]
Arin O. Asia-Pacific Region:  myths, illusions and reality. Eastern Asia: economy, politics, and security. Moscow:  Nauka/Flinta, 1997 [АТР: мифы, иллюзии и реальность. Восточная Азия: экономика, политика и безопасность. – М.: Флинта •Наука, 1997. – 436 с. ( (Флинта);  (Наука))]
Aliyev R.Sh.-A. Japan's Foreign Policy in 70s – early 80s: Theory and Practice. Moscow:  Nauka Publishers, 1986 [Внешняя политика Японии в 70-х – начале 80-х годов (теория и практика). – М.: Наука (ГРВЛ), 1986. – 312 с.]
Aliyev R. Japan and the Soviet-Chinese Relations of 1931–1975. Moscow:  IFES,  1976 [Япония и советско-китайские отношения. – Информационный бюллетень, № 70. – М.: Изд-во ИДВ АН СССР, 1976. – 197 с.]

Books for a general audience
Arin Oleg (Alex Battler). Russia between East and West. (In Russian). Moscow: Izdatelstvo ITRK, 2015. – 304 p.
Arin, Oleg (Alex Battler). Russian mindset. (In Russian: Русский умострой).  Moscow: Izdatelstvo ITRK, 2015. – 336 p.
Battler, Valentina and Alex. Opinions and Truth. Articles about Art and Literature. Moscow: Izdatelstvo ITRK, 2015. – 272 p.
Arin O. (Alex Battler). Russia in Mundism. [Раша в мундизме (электронная версия) – Россия, 2011. – 337 с. (ББК 87 87.6 66.4 А 81)]
Arin O.  Destroyer of brains. On Russian pseudo-science [Разрушители мозга. О российской лженауке (электронная версия) – Россия, 2011. – 206 с. (ББК 87 87.6 66.4 А 81)]
Arin Oleg. The Truth and Inventions about Tsarist's Russia [Правда и вымыслы о царской России. Конец XIX начало XX века. М.: ЛЕНАНД, 2010. –  200 с.]
Arin Oleg. The formula of current Russia: marasmus in cube but with zero result [Формула современной России: Маразм в кубе, но с нулевым результатом. – М.: ЛЕНАНД, 2009. – 256 с.]
Arin Oleg, Alex Battler. Russia in Intoxication of Dollargasm and If-ism [Россия в угаре долларгазма и еслибизма. – М.: Едиториал УРСС, 2008. – 288 с.]
Arin Oleg. Between Titi and Caca. The Impressions of a tourist… but not only [Между Тити и Кака. Впечатления туриста… и не только. Изд. 2-е, испр. и доп. – М.: Издательство ЛКИ, 2008. – 256 с.]
Arin O. Russia in the Strategic Trap. Second edition. Moscow: Algorithm, 2003 [Россия в стратегическом капкане Изд. 2-е., расширенное. – М.: Алгоритм, 2003. – 352 с.]
First edition: Россия в стратегическом капкане. – М. Флинта, 1997. – 286 с.
Arin Oleg, Valentina Arina. Between Titi and Caca. The Impressions of a tourist… but not only [Между Тити и Кака. Впечатления туриста… и не только. –  М.: Альянс, 2001. – 208 с.]
Arin Oleg. Russia on roadside of the world. M.: Linor [Россия на обочине мира. –  М.: Линор, 1999. – 292 с.]
Arin Oleg. Tsarist's Russia: Myths and Realities [Царская Россия: мифы и реальность /конец XIX – начало XX века/ – М.: Линор, 1999. – 64 с.]
Battler Alex and Valentina. Immigration to North America. The advices of Russian-Canadians [Иммиграция в Северную Америку. – М.: Информдинамо, 1997. – 112 с.]

Selected academic books (coauthored)
Alex Battler is a co-author of more than twenty collective monographs and books. Among them particularly:

Arin Oleg. The Methodology of superlongterm prognosis (p. 33–40); Prognosis of the development of world relations in 21st century (p. 483–554) [Методология сверхдолгосрочного прогноза (с. 33–40); Прогноз развития мировых отношений в XXI веке (с. 483–554)] In: Astronautics in 21st century. An endeavor of a forecast up to 2101 [Космонавтика XXI века. Попытка прогноза развития до 2101 г./ Под ред. академика РАН Б.Е. Чертока. – М.: Идательство «РТСофт», 2010. – 864 с.]
Arin O.  Russia's role in economic cooperations with East-Asian countries [Роль России в экономическом сотрудничестве со странами Восточной Азии (с. 22–40)] – In: New trends in international relations in Asia [В: Новые тенденции в международных отношениях в Азии. – М.: ИВ РАН, 2002. – 242 с.]
Aliev R.A.  Russia and the countries of Northeastnern Asia: problems and perspectives of economic cooperations [Россия и страны Северо-Восточной Азии: проблемы и перспективы экономического сотрудничества (с. 94–149)]. In: Economic interests of Russia in contiguous regions [В: Экономические интересы России в сопредельных районах. М.:МГИМО, 2000. – 150 с.]
Arin O.A. Russia's place and role in strategic doctrines and concepts of the USA [Место и роль России в стратегических доктринах и концепциях США (с. 20–34)]. In: Scientific works of MNEPU [В.: Научные труды МНЭПУ. Серия Политология. Выпуск 3, Москва, 2000. – 234 с.]
Aliev R.Sh.-A. Security and economic conjuncture in Pacific Ocean zone [Безопасность и экономическая конъюнктура в Тихоокеанской зоне (с. 112–125)]. – In Problems of security in Asia Pacific region [В: Проблемы обеспечения безопасности в Азиатско-Тихоокеанском регионе. – М.:Научная книга, 1999. – 228 с.]
Arin O.A. National security: methodological and terminological aspects [Национальная безопасность: методологические и терминологические аспекты (с.77–91)]. In Political culture. Scientific works of MNEPU [В: Политическая культура. Научные труды МНЭПУ. Серия Политология. Выпуск 6. Москва, 1999. – 224 с.]
Arin Oleg. Place and Role of  PRC and Russia in Eastern Asia [Место и роль КНР и России в Восточной Азии (с. 306–317)].  In Orient and Russia at the turn of 21st century [В: Восток и Россия на рубеже XXI века. –  М., 1998. – 368 с.]
Aliev R. Sh.-A. Authority and Science or What You Plant is What You Reap [Власть и наука, или как аукнется, так и откликнется (с. 109–131)]. In:  The Heartbeat of Reform. Moscow: Progress Publishers [В: Пульс реформ. Юристы и политологи размышляют. Составитель Ю. Батурин.   М., Прогресс, 1989. – 378 с.] 
In English: Aliyev Rafik. Authority and Science or What You Plant is What You Reap (p. 113–137). In:  The Heartbeat of Reform. Moscow: Progress Publishers, 1990. – 370 p.
Aliyev R.Sh.-A.  Glasnost' in the snare of foreign policy and international relations [Гласность в тенетах внешней политики и международных отношений (с.220–237)]. In Glasnost: opinions, analysis, policy. Moscow: Yuridicheskaya Literatura Publishers, 1989:  220–37.  [В:  Гласность: мнения, поиски, политика. – М.: Юридическая литература, 1989. – 368 с.]
Aliyev Rafik. Problems of Security in Asia-Pacific (Study). Chapter 3 (p. 35–47).  New Delhi (India), Allied Publishers, 1987. – 184 p.
Aliev R.Sh.-A. Japan's Pacific Strategy  [Тихоокеанская стратегия Японии. (Сс. 64 – 119)]; The Pacific Community and the People's Republic of China [Тихоокеанское сообщество и КНР (с. 222 – 244)].  In The Pacific Community. Outlook. [В: Тихоокеанское сообщество: планы и перспективы]. – М.: Наука, 1987. –  352 с.
In English: Aliev R. Sh.-A. Japan's Pacific Strategy (p. 72–133); The Pacific Community and the People's Republic of China (p. 244–271). In: The Pacific Community. Outlook. Moscow, Progress Publishers, 1988.

External links
 Alex Battler's Official Website (in English)
 Oleg Arin's Official Website (in Russian)

Reviews, interviews

 Fursov A.I. Capitalism and International Relations. Rev.: Battler Alex. Mirology: Progress and Force in the World Relations. Vol. II. Struggle of all against all. Moscow: ITRK, 2015 // «Knowledge. Understanding. Science», # 4, 2015. (Фурсов А.И. Капитализм и международные отношения. Рец.: А. Бэттлер «Мирология. Прогресс и сила в мировых отношениях». М.: ИТРК, 2015. Т. II. Борьба всех против всех // «Знание. Понимание. Умение», № 4, 2015.)
 Fursov A.I. Into the abyss with capitalism. Rev.: Battler Alex. Mirology: Progress and Force in the World Relations. Vol. II. Struggle of all against all. Moscow: ITRK, 2015 // «Literaturnaya gazetta», # 1-2, 21 January 2016. (Фурсов А.И. Капитализм и международные отношения. Рец.: А. Бэттлер «Мирология. Прогресс и сила в мировых отношениях». М.: ИТРК, 2015. Т. II. Борьба всех против всех // Литературная газета, № 1–2б 21 января 2016.)
 Kirkus Review: Alex Battler. Dialectics of Force: Ontobia. New York, 2013. – 322 p. ( // https://www.kirkusreviews.com › author › alex-battler. Reviewed: Aug. 5, 2013.
 Kirkus Review: Alex Battler. Society: Progress and Force (Criteria and First Principles). New York, 2013. – 376 p. // https://www.kirkusreviews.com › author › alex-battler. Reviewed: May 17, 2013.
 Facts against myths (Факты против мифов // Книжное обозрение, № 27-28, 2009, с. 12.
 Plyakin A. On the way to Iff-lands (Плякин А. На пути в Еслибляндию // НГ ExLIBRIS, 2009-08-27.)
 Current feudalism (Современный феодализм // Книжное обозрение, №25-26, 2009, с. 12.)
 «Bits and pieces» plus democracy («Рожки да ножки» плюс демократия). – Interview published in Russian Journal (Интервью с сокращениями опубликовано // Русский журнал, 08 июня 2009)
 Yu. M. Baturin. A. Battler. Society: progress and force (Criteria and First Principles) [Ю.М. Батурин. – А. Бэттлер. Общество: прогресс и сила (критерии и основные начала) // Вопросы философии, №3, 2009, с. 179-181]
 Baturin Yuri. Progress as delta of life [Батурин Юрий. Прогресс как дельта жизни. (На книгу «Общество: прогресс и сила») // НГ-EX Libres, 22 января 2009 года. С.7.]
 Michail Kheifiz. One more – perhaps senseless endeavor to understand Russia by mind [Михаил Хейфиц. Еще одна – возможно, бессмысленная – попытка понять Россию умом // «Vesty» (Israel), March 18 and April 1, 2004]
 Interview for «Dungfang Zaobao» (China, Shanghai), November 11, 2004, p. 8.]
 «We bury ourselves» («Мы сами себя хороним») // Interview for «Zavtra» (February/March, 2003, № 9, p. 5).
 Sokolov B. V. Book Review: O. Arin. The World without Russia. M.: Algoritm, 2002 // Book Review, 16 January 2003 (Соколов Б.В. Арин О. Мир без России. М.: ЭКСМО; Алгоритм, 2002 // Книжное обозрение, 2003-01-16.)
 Yakovlev A.G. Book Review: O. Arin. Asia Pacific Region: Myths, illusions and reality. Eastern Asia: economy, politics, and security. M.: Nauka/Flinta, 1997 // «Problems of Far East», # 3, 1998. (Яковлев А. Г. Рецензия на монографию: О. Арин. Азиатско-тихоокеанский регион: мифы, иллюзии и реальность. Восточная Азия: экономика, политика, безопасность. М.: Флинта, Наука, 1997 // «Проблемы Дальнего Востока», 1998, № 3.)
 Zagorskyi A. Asia Pacific region: scopes of the concept. Book Review: O. Arin. Asia Pacific Region: Myths, illusions and reality. Eastern Asia: economy, politics, and security. M.: Nauka/Flinta, 1997 // «World economy and international relations», # 6, 1999. (Загорский А. Азиатско-тихоокеанский регион: границы понятия. — О. Арин. Азиатско-тихоокеанский регион: мифы, иллюзии и реальность. Восточная Азия: экономика, политика, безопасность. М.: Флинта, Наука, 1997 // «Мировая экономика и международные отношения», 1999, № 6.)

Political philosophers
Russian political philosophers
International relations scholars
Russian political scientists
Russian philosophers
Canadian people of Russian descent
Canadian political scientists
Living people
1946 births
Canadian philosophers
Academic staff of Nagoya University